The Road to Science Fiction is a series of science fiction anthologies edited by American science fiction author, scholar and editor James Gunn. Composed as a textbook set to teach the evolution of science fiction literature, the series is now available as mass market publications.

The six-volume set collects many of the most influential works of the genre. It was published originally by Signet and then by White Wolf Games Studio. Volumes 1 through 4 are currently being reprinted in paperback format by the company Scarecrow Press.

Volume 1: From Gilgamesh to Wells  
(Signet, 1979; Scarecrow Press, December 2002)

Contents:
 excerpt from A True Story, by Lucian of Samosata
 excerpt from The Voyages and Travels of Sir John Mandeville, Anonymous
 excerpt from Utopia, by Thomas More
 excerpt from The City of the Sun, by Tommaso Campanella
 excerpt from New Atlantis by Francis Bacon
 Somnium, or Lunar Astronomy, by Johannes Kepler
 excerpt from A Voyage to the Moon, by Cyrano de Bergerac
 excerpt from A Voyage to Laputa, by Jonathan Swift
 excerpt from The Journey to the World Underground, by Ludvig Holberg
 "Micromégas," by Voltaire (not included in the Signet edition)
 excerpt from Frankenstein, by Mary Shelley
 "Rappaccini's Daughter," by Nathaniel Hawthorne
 "Mellonta Tauta," by Edgar Allan Poe
 "The Diamond Lens," by Fitz-James O'Brien
 excerpt from Twenty Thousand Leagues Under the Sea, by Jules Verne
 excerpt from Around the Moon, by Jules Verne
 excerpt from She, by H. Rider Haggard
 excerpt from Looking Backward, by Edward Bellamy
 "The Damned Thing," by Ambrose Bierce
 "With the Night Mail," by Rudyard Kipling
 "The Star," by H. G. Wells
 A selected bibliography of books about Science Fiction
 A basic Science-Fiction library

Volume 2: From Wells to Heinlein 
(Signet, 1979; Scarecrow Press, September, 2002)

Contents:
 "The New Accelerator," by H. G. Wells
 "The Machine Stops," by E. M. Forster
 excerpt from The Chessmen of Mars (Signet edition) or Under the Moons of Mars, by Edgar Rice Burroughs
 "The People of the Pit," by A. Merritt; replaced by Merritt's "The Moon Pool" in the Scarecrow Press edition (2002)
 "The Red One," by Jack London
 "Dagon," by H. P. Lovecraft
 "The Tissue-Culture King," by Julian Huxley
 "The Revolt of the Pedestrians," by David H. Keller, M.D.
 excerpt from Last and First Men, by Olaf Stapledon
 excerpt from Brave New World, by Aldous Huxley
 "A Martian Odyssey," by Stanley G. Weinbaum
 "Twilight," by John W. Campbell
 "Proxima Centauri," by Murray Leinster
 "What's It Like Out There?," by Edmond Hamilton
 "With Folded Hands," by Jack Williamson
 "Hyperpilosity," by L. Sprague de Camp
 "The Faithful," by Lester del Rey
 "Black Destroyer," by A. E. van Vogt
 "Nightfall," by Isaac Asimov
 "Requiem," by Robert A. Heinlein
 A chronology of Science Fiction

Volume 3: From Heinlein to Here 
(Signet, 1979; Scarecrow Press, May 2002)

The best work published from 1940 to 1977.

Contents:
 "All You Zombies," by Robert A. Heinlein
 "Reason," by Isaac Asimov
 "Desertion," by Clifford D. Simak
 "Mimsy Were the Borogoves," by Lewis Padgett (Henry Kuttner and C. L. Moore)
 "The Million-Year Picnic," by Ray Bradbury
 "Thunder and Roses," by Theodore Sturgeon
 "That Only a Mother," by Judith Merril
 "Brooklyn Project," by William Tenn (Philip Klass)
 "Coming Attraction," by Fritz Leiber
 "The Sentinel," by Arthur C. Clarke
 "Sail On! Sail On!," by José Farmer
 "Critical Factor," by  Hal Clement
 "Fondly Fahrenheit," by Alfred Bester
 "The Cold Equations," by Tom Godwin
 "The Game of Rat and Dragon," by Cordwainer Smith
 "Pilgrimage to Earth," by Robert Sheckley
 "Who Can Replace a Man?," by Brian W. Aldiss
 "Harrison Bergeron," by Kurt Vonnegut, Jr.
 "The Streets of Ashkelon," by Harry Harrison
 "The Terminal Beach," by J. G. Ballard
 "Dolphin's Way," by  Gordon R. Dickson
 "Slow Tuesday Night," by R. A. Lafferty
 "Day Million," by Frederik Pohl
 "We Can Remember It for You Wholesale," by Philip K. Dick
 "I Have No Mouth, and I Must Scream," by Harlan Ellison
 "Aye, and Gomorrah," by  Samuel R. Delany
 "The Jigsaw Man," by Larry Niven
 "Kyrie," by Poul Anderson
 "Masks," by Damon Knight
 excerpt from Stand on Zanzibar, by John Brunner
 "The Big Flash," by Norman Spinrad
 "Sundance," by Robert Silverberg
 excerpt from The Left Hand of Darkness, by Ursula K. Le Guin
 "When It Changed," by Joanna Russ
 "The Engine at Heartspring's Center," by Roger Zelazny
 "Tricentennial," by Joe Haldeman

Volume 4: From Here to Forever 
(Signet, 1982; White Wolf, January 1997; Scarecrow Press, 2003)

Stories selected for their quality of writing. 

Contents:
 "Born of Man and Woman," by Richard Matheson
 "The Luckiest Man in Denv," by C. M. Kornbluth (not included in the Signet edition)
 "Common Time," by James Blish (not included in the Signet edition)
 "My Boy Friend's Name is Jello," by Avram Davidson
 "The First Canticle," by Walter M. Miller, Jr.
 "Nobody Bothers Gus," by Algis Budrys
 "Flowers for Algernon," by Daniel Keyes
 "The Moon Moth," by Jack Vance
 "The Library of Babel," by Jorge Luis Borges
 excerpt from Dune, by Frank Herbert
 "Light of Other Days," by Bob Shaw
 "The First Sally (A), or Trurl's Electronic Bard," by Stanisław Lem
 "The Heat Death of the Universe," by Pamela Zoline
 "The Planners," by Kate Wilhelm
 "The Dance of the Changer and the Three," by Terry Carr
 "The Last Flight of Dr. Ain," by James Tiptree, Jr. (Alice Sheldon)
 "Where No Sun Shines," by Gardner Dozois
 "The Island of Doctor Death and Other Stories," by Gene Wolfe
 "Angouleme," by Thomas M. Disch
 "Gather Blue Roses," by Pamela Sargent
 "With a Finger in My I," by David Gerrold
 "The Ghost Writer," by George Alec Effinger (Signet edition)
 "Of Mist, and Grass, and Sand," by Vonda N. McIntyre
 "Air Raid," by John Varley
 "Uncoupling," by Barry N. Malzberg
 "Rogue Tomato," by Michael Bishop
 "This Tower of Ashes," by George R. R. Martin
 "Particle Theory," by Edward Bryant
 "View from a Height," by Joan D. Vinge
 "The Word Sweep," by George Zebrowski
 "The World Science Fiction Convention of 2080," by Ian Watson
 "Abominable," by Carol Emshwiller
 "Exposures," by Gregory Benford
 "Schrödinger's Kitten," by George Alec Effinger (not included in the Signet edition)

Volume 5: The British Way 
(White Wolf, March 1998)

Influential British SF published prior to 1986

Contents:

 excerpt from The Battle of Dorking: Reminiscences of a Volunteer by Lieutenant-Colonel Sir George Tomkyns Chesney
 excerpt from Flatland by Edwin A. Abbott
 excerpt from After London; or, Wild England by Richard Jefferies
 "The Doom of London," by Robert Barr
 "A Corner in Lightning," by George Griffith
 "The Country of the Blind," by H. G. Wells
 "As Easy as A.B.C.," by Rudyard Kipling
 "A Negligible Experiment," by John D. Beresford
 "The Horror of the Heights," by Sir Arthur Conan Doyle
 "The Rat," by S. Fowler Wright
 excerpt from Star Maker, by Olaf Stapledon
 "The Great Fog," by H. F. Heard
 "Hobbyist," by Eric Frank Russell
 "Dreams Are Sacred," by Peter Phillips
 "Made in U.S.A.," by J. T. McIntosh
 "The Star," by Arthur C. Clarke
 "The Emptiness of Space," by John Wyndham
 "The Voices of Time," by J. G. Ballard
 "The Drowned Giant," by J. G. Ballard
 "The Totally Rich," by John Brunner
 "Mouth of Hell," by David I. Masson
 "The Discontinuous," by D. G. Compton
 "It's Smart to Have an English Address," by D. G. Compton
 "The Muse," by Anthony Burgess
 "The Nature of the Catastrophe," by Michael Moorcock
 "The Power of Time," by Josephine Saxton
 "Mason's Life," by Kingsley Amis
 "Settling the World," by M. John Harrison
 "Working in the Spaceship Yards," by Brian W. Aldiss
 "Appearance of Life," by Brian W. Aldiss
 "An Infinite Summer," by Christopher Priest
 "Custom Fitting," by James White
 "Written in Water," by Tanith Lee
 "The Great Atlantic Swimming Race," by Ian Watson
 "And He Not Busy Being Born," by Brian M. Stableford

Volume 6: Around the World  
(White Wolf, July 1998)

Contents:

France
  excerpt from Journey to the Center of the Earth by Jules Verne
 "The War of the Twentieth Century," by Albert Robida
 "Another World," by J.-H. Rosny-Aîné
 "The Dead Fish," by Boris Vian
 "Heavier Than Sleep," by Philippe Curval
 "The Valley of Echoes," by Gérard Klein
 "The Knot," by Élisabeth Vonarburg

Germany
 "The Sandman," by E. T. A. Hoffmann
 "The Universal Library," by Kurd Lasswitz
 "The Hunter Gracchus," by Franz Kafka
 "The Building," by Herbert W. Franke
 "Loitering at Death's Door," by Wolfgang Jeschke
 "Ikaros," by Erik Simon

Scandinavia and Finland
 "Mnemosyne's Children," by Svend Åge Madsen
 "Time Everlasting," by Sam J. Lundwall

Eastern Europe
 Epilogue from R.U.R. by Karel Čapek
 "The Hunt," by Stanisław Lem (from Tales of Pirx the Pilot)
 "The Divided Carla," by Josef Nesvadba
 "That Invincible Human Spirit, or, The Golden Ships," by Alexandr Kramer
 "The Neuhof Treaty," by Ovid S. Crohmalniceanu

Russia
 "The Strangers," by Arkady and Boris Strugatsky
 "Share It With Me," by Kirill Bulychev

Italy
 "The Time Machine," by Dino Buzzati
 "Cancerqueen," by Tommaso Landolfi
 "The Spiral," by Italo Calvino

Spain and Latin America
 "The Alabaster Garden," by Teresa Inglés
 "The Babylon Lottery," by Jorge Luis Borges
 "Blacamán the Good, Vendor of Miracles," by Gabriel García Márquez
 "Chac-Mool," by Carlos Fuentes

India
 "Einstein the Second," by Laxman Londhe

China
 "The Mirror Image of the Earth," by Zheng Wenguang
 "Corrosion," by Ye Yonglie

Japan
 "Beyond the Curve," by Kōbō Abe
 "Take Your Choice," by Sakyo Komatsu
 "The Legend of the Paper Spaceship," by Tetsu Yano

References 
 SF Site review of Volume 5
 The Scarecrow Press

Road to Science Fiction, The